The 2021 Britain and Ireland heat wave was a period of unusually hot weather in July 2021 that led to record-breaking temperatures in the UK and Ireland.

On 19 July, the Met Office issued its first ever extreme heat warning for parts of the UK. Temperatures soared across the United Kingdom over a weekend which saw all four nations record the hottest day of the year. On 17 July, temperatures reached  in County Down, Northern Ireland.

In the Republic of Ireland, Met Éireann issued its first ever Status Orange high temperature warning for six counties on 20 July, after temperatures reached  in Athenry, County Galway on 17 July.

On 21 July, temperatures reached  at Heathrow, London. In Ireland, temperatures reached  at Mount Dillon, County Roscommon.

Despite the extreme weather warning, the 2021 July heatwave was relatively mild in comparison to heatwaves in the UK and Ireland of previous and subsequent years, with heatwaves in previous years surpassing the maximum temperature of this heatwave, particularly in the south east.

See also

References

2021 in Ireland
2021 meteorology
2021 natural disasters
2021 heat waves
2021 disasters in the United Kingdom
2021
July 2021 events in the United Kingdom
Climate change in the United Kingdom
2021 disasters in Ireland